Despite having a flourishing Chinese and Malay film industry in the 1950s and 1960s, Singapore's film industry declined after independence in 1965. Film production increased in the 1990s, which saw the first locally-produced feature-length films. There were a few films that featured Singaporean actors and were set in Singapore, including Saint Jack, They Call Her Cleopatra Wong and Crazy Rich Asians.

After 1990

Early 1990s pioneers
The first fully Singapore funded film came in 1991's Medium Rare, which was based on a real-life local cult killer, Adrian Lim, who was hanged in 1988 for murder.  Although it cost over S$2 million in production, the film performed dismally at the box office.  The film took in merely S$130,000 locally but broke the ice for the next coming Singapore movie, Bugis Street, which was released in 1995.  Bugis Street was a gaudy film about the famous sleazy district where transvestites and transsexuals were found. Both Medium Rare and Bugis Street were directed by non Singaporeans. The same year saw the release of Mee Pok Man, the first full-length film made by an independent Singaporean filmmaker, Eric Khoo, on a tight budget of S$100,000.  Concerning a lonely noodle seller who falls for a prostitute, Mee Pok Man earned much critical accolade worldwide and encouraged more experimental, independent filmmaking in the nation.

Army Daze, made in 1996, took a humorous look at Singapore's national service, and turned in high profits at the box office.

In 1997 came another Eric Khoo feature film, 12 Storeys, a highly acclaimed production which was the first Singaporean film to be shown at Cannes.  Interweaving 3 stories about life in the HDB high-rise flats, 12 Storeys was seen as a breakthrough for Singaporean films, combining a coherent plot with Singaporean production crew and actors, such as Jack Neo and Koh Boon Pin.  The rest of the decade was encouraging for the growing film industry.  Glen Goei's Forever Fever (1998) was picked up by Miramax for S$4.5 million and re-released in the U.S. as That's the Way I Like It.  These two years saw the releases of a number of other films, such as A Road Less Travelled (1997), God or Dog (1997), Tiger's Whip (1998) and The Teenage Textbook Movie (1998).

Late 1990s successes
However, it was the phenomenal success of Money No Enough (1998) which eventually catapulted the nation's drive towards movie-making.  Using a local crew of actors drawn from television comedies, this 'heartland' comedy written by Jack Neo used a smattering of Singlish and Hokkien to make a realistic, easily identifiable drama about everybody's quest to make a quick buck.  Made with less than S$1 million, it raked in S$5,800,000, making it the most commercially profitable local film to date.  It also demonstrated the viable potential of Singapore's film industry. The next year would be a boom year for local films.  Eight Singaporean feature films were made in 1999 alone, the most notable being Liang Po Po: The Movie (starring Jack Neo in a reprisal of his television cross-gender role), That One No Enough, the first directorial effect of Jack Neo, and Eating Air, made by film critic Kelvin Tong and film editor Jasmine Ng on a budget of S$800,000.  Eating Air did not break even; That One No Enough barely did and only Liang Po Po: The Movie continued the vein of commercial success of Money No Enough, collecting S$3.03 million. 

1999 also marked a watershed for Singapore films.  Raintree Pictures, the filmmaking subsidiary of MediaCorp Productions, was started. Raintree Pictures invested in two regional co-productions, Liang Po Po and The Truth About Jane and Sam, which starred Singaporean television lead actress Fann Wong with Taiwanese singer Peter Ho and Hong Kong director Derek Yee.  Raintree Pictures would finance a number of local and Hong Kong productions in years to come, and are the producer company of the films of Jack Neo.  Subsequent productions, such as 2000 AD (2000) and The Tree (2001), also drew on Hong Kong star power; the company invested in critically acclaimed regional films such as The Eye (2002) and Infernal Affairs II (2003).  Raintree Pictures also produced two English-language local productions, Chicken Rice War (2000) and One Leg Kicking (2001).

With the financing of a local production company and the setting up of organisations such as the Singapore Film Commission (SFC, set up in 1998), budding filmmakers, especially independent ones, found it easier to make movies on subsidies and loaned funding.  The advent of digital video also meant that some novice filmmakers could experiment with cheaper alternatives.  Features like Stories about Love (2000) and Return to Pontianak (2001) were both shot on digital videos, even though they were not commercial successes.

Early 2000s
The success story since the turn of the 21st century must be from local comedian-turned-director Jack Neo.  Financed by Raintree Pictures, he made a number of hits dealing with Singapore's heartland problems in an engaging and deceptively light-hearted fashion.  I Not Stupid (2002) was a peek into the ultra-competitive academic lifestyle as seen through three local students who performed poorly in grades; its acerbic social commentary marked another height for Singaporean films. Homerun (2003) was a remake of the Iranian Children of Heaven in a local, pre-independent era context; it won for its young lead Megan Zheng the first Golden Horse Award for Best Newcomer.  The Best Bet (2004) took a humorous dig at heartlanders' obsessions with lotteries.  Neo averages a film per year and his productions feature local Singaporean (usually television) artistes in filmic roles.  They have been successes locally and abroad, especially in those places with a Chinese-language market, such as Hong Kong.  He has started his own artiste management company, J-Team Productions.

Royston Tan, a young Singapore TV commercial director who has been making award-winning shorts for years, released 15: The Movie, his first feature, in 2003.  An expanded version of an earlier short film he made, this 90-min movie on the fringe and drug-abusing delinquents used bold subject-matter and featured some graphic scenes with non-professional actors.  When the film censorship board passed it with cuts, it prompted a backlash from the director in the form of Cut, an all-singing musical satire à la Tsai Ming-liang lampooning the system.  This short film was passed uncensored by the board and was seen during the Singapore International Film Festival, but there were open discussions about it during local parliamentary sessions, prompting remarks that the government was "not amused" by it.  Royston Tan has since made three more features, 4:30 (2005), 881 (2007) and 12 Lotus (2008).

2005 to 2009
2005 could be seen as another mini-boom year for Singaporean cinema, with commercially successful fares like Kelvin Tong's horror flick The Maid, two Jack-Neo co-directed movies, I Do I Do and One More Chance, and less mainstream offerings like Eric Khoo's critically acclaimed Cannes opener Be with Me, and Perth, Djinn's dark take on Scorsese's Taxi Driver.

In 2006, the independent feature Becoming Royston paid homage to the above-mentioned filmmaker.  It was made under new Originasian Pictures. The film went on its festival run in Europe and South Asia and was released in 2007. 2006 also saw the premiere of Singapore Dreaming by Woo Yen Yen and Colin Goh, who won the Montblanc New Screenwriters Award at the San Sebastian International Film Festival, the first Singaporeans to do so. The film was also screened at numerous festivals worldwide and, in 2007, became the first Singaporean feature to win the Audience Award for Narrative Feature at the Asian American International Film Festival in New York.

In 2007, Jack Neo released another film known as Just Follow Law (我们在政府部门的日子) which took a dig at bureaucracy in the civil service, as well as the lengthy procedures one had to go through in Singapore to get a permit for various things. This film garnered generally positive reviews and was moderately successful at the box office. However, the success story of the year was Royston Tan's 881, which brought Singapore's seventh month getai culture to the big screens. While it was intended to be a niche film, it exceeded expectations and became one of the highest grossing local films of all time. Critics generally gave it positive reviews, and many believe that it was the fact that the film gave younger Singaporean Chinese more insight into their traditional culture that made it a success. In addition, the use of Hokkien songs, which had been suppressed by the government as part of the Speak Mandarin Campaign, may have contributed to its popularity.

In 2008, Eric Khoo's Tamil language social drama My Magic became Singapore's first film to compete for the Palme d'Or at the Cannes Film Festival.

2010 and beyond
A wave of young filmmakers, considered the Singaporean new wave, who are educated in local and overseas film schools, begin to dominate the film scene.

Ilo Ilo (Chinese: 爸妈不在家), the debut feature of director Anthony Chen, premiered at the 2013 Cannes Film Festival as part of the Directors' Fortnight on 19 May 2013 to very positive reviews. The film was awarded the Camera d'Or award, thus becoming the first Singaporean feature film to win an award at the Cannes Film Festival. It received six nominations at the Golden Horse Film Festival and Awards., and won 4:  Best Film, Best New Director, Best Original Screenplay and Best Supporting Actress for Yeo Yann Yann. In total Ilo Ilo has received 21 awards and 10 nominations around the world, as well as the highest ranking Singaporean-made film on IMDB, making it the most critically acclaimed film in the history of Singaporean cinema.

See also
 Cinema of the world
 Asian cinema
 Censorship in Singapore
 Southeast Asian cinema
 East Asian cinema
 Cinema of Malaysia
 World cinema
 List of Singaporean films
 List of films set in Singapore
 List of cinemas in Singapore
 List of highest-grossing films in Singapore
 The Substation

References

Further reading
 Ciecko, Anne Tereska (2006) Contemporary Asian Cinema. New York: Berg. 
 Millet, Raphaël (2006) Singapore Cinema. Singapore: Editions Didier Millet 
 Ramani, Vinita  (January 26, 2006). "Speech Acts- Censorship and Documentary Filmmaking in Singapore". Criticine.
 Slater, Ben (2006) Kinda Hot: The Making of Saint Jack in Singapore. Singapore: Marshall Cavendish. 
 Tan, Kenneth Paul (2008) Cinema and Television in Singapore: Resistance in One Dimension. Leiden, The Netherlands: Brill. ; ISSN 1567-2794. see website
 Uhde, Jan and Uhde, Yvonne (2000) Latent Images: Film in Singapore. Singapore: Oxford University Press 
 Uhde, Jan and Uhde, Yvonne (2009) Latent Images: Film in Singapore. Second updated and revised edition. Singapore: National University of Singapore Press

External links
 Singapore Film Commission
 Singapore International Film Festival
 Southeast Asian Cinematheque (formerly Singapore Cinematheque)
 Asian Film Archive
 Singapore Film Society
 OhGenki Movies Singapore
 InCinemas.sg
 Criticine Singapore  – Singapore page of Southeast Asian Cinema journal Criticine
 Singapore movie discussion forum
 Sinema.sg
 SINdie
 Famegate Studios 
 Filmhouse Rental